Jason Wrigley (born 30 April 1980) is a former New Zealand-born professional rugby league player. During the 2004 NRL season, he made two appearances off the bench for the Penrith Panthers.

Born in Wellington, as of 2017, Wrigley is a member of the coaching staff of the Panthers, serving as the side's football manager.

References

1980 births
Living people
New Zealand expatriate rugby league players
New Zealand rugby league players
Penrith Panthers players
Rugby league players from Wellington City